Middle Pickering Rural Historic District also known as the Pickering & Pigeon Run Rural Historic District, is a national historic district located in Charlestown Township, East Pikeland Township, and West Pikeland Township, Chester County, Pennsylvania. It is adjacent to the Charlestown Village Historic District. It encompasses 76 contributing buildings, 5 contributing sites, and 15 contributing structures in rural northern Chester County. Included are 15 farmsteads dated to the 18th or 19th century, two Lutheran churches and cemeteries, the sites of two small industrial complexes, and the tiny village of Merlin.  Located in the district and listed separately is the Oskar G. Stonorov House.

It was listed on the National Register of Historic Places in 1991.

References

Historic districts on the National Register of Historic Places in Pennsylvania
Historic districts in Chester County, Pennsylvania
National Register of Historic Places in Chester County, Pennsylvania
1991 establishments in Pennsylvania